Ultra is the codename for cryptographic intelligence obtained from German signal traffic in World War II.

Ultra may also refer to:

Computing
 Adobe Ultra, a vector-keying application
 Sun Ultra series, a brand of computer workstations and servers
 ULTRA (machine translation system), a machine translation system

Fiction
 Ultra (film), a 1991 Italian drama film
 Ultra (comics), a miniseries by Image Comics
 Ultra Series, the Ultraman franchise
 Ultra the Multi-Alien, a DC Comics superhero

Gaming
 Ultra (newsletter), a newsletter for Advanced Third Reich
 Ultra Games, a subsidiary of Konami of America

Music
 Ultra (British band), an English pop band
 Ultra, a collaboration between two members of hip hop group Ultramagnetic MCs
 Ultra (music), a post-punk movement in the Netherlands
 Ultra house, a music place in Handen, Sweden
 Ultra Music Festival, an annual electronic festival in Miami, Florida
 Ultra Records, a record label

Albums and songs
 Ultra (Depeche Mode album), 1997
 Ultra (Laura Põldvere album), 2009
 Ultra (Ultra album), 1999
 Ultra (Zomby album), 2016
 Ultra, by Mickey Kojak, 2022
 Ultra, by Schaft, 2016
 "Ultra", a song by KMFDM

Politics
 Ultra (Malaysia), a Malaysian group of racial extremists
 ULTRA (UK agency), the Unrelated Live Transplant Regulatory Authority, a defunct UK government regulatory body
 Ultra-royalists or Ultras, a reactionary group after Napoleon's defeat

Sport
 Ultras, football fans renowned for ultra-fanatical support, sometimes to the point of violence
 The ULTRA (University of Life Training and Recreational Arena), former name for the PhilSports Arena in Pasig, Philippines
 Ultra Motorsports, a NASCAR team that ran from 1995–2005
 Ultra running, endurance races at distances typically beyond marathon

Other uses
 Ultra, avant-garde Finnish-Swedish magazine in Finland 
 ULTra (rapid transit), a personal rapid transit system deployed at London Heathrow airport
 Ultra (TV channel), a Serbian children's channel
 Ultra Electronics, a British defence and aerospace company
 Ultra prominent peak, a mountain with a topographic prominence of at least 1,500 metres
 Ultra Food & Drug, a defunct supermarket chain in Ontario, Canada
 Ultra Distributors, a home video distribution company in India

See also
 Ultras (disambiguation)
 Ultraa
 MKULTRA (disambiguation)